Spyridium lawrencei, commonly known as small-leaf spyridium or small-leaf dustymiller, is a species of flowering plant in the family Rhamnaceae and is endemic to Tasmania. It is an erect, compact or straggling shrub with small, leathery, round to heart-shaped leaves, and dense heads of hairy, cream-coloured flowers.

Description
The upper surface of the leaves is more or less glabrous and the lower surface is densely hairy. Flowering occurs from late November to April, with a peak in February.

Taxonomy
This species was first formally described in 1855 by Joseph Dalton Hooker who gave it the name Cryptandra lawrencei in The botany of the Antarctic voyage of H.M. Discovery ships Erebus and Terror from specimens collected by Ronald Campbell Gunn. In 1863, George Bentham changed the name to Spyridium lawrencei in Flora Australiensis. The specific epithet (lawrencei) honours Robert William Lawrence who discovered the species.

Distribution and habitat
Spyridium lawrencei grows in the zone between riversides and woodland or forest on the central east coast and eastern midlands of Tasmania, mainly near to Swan, Apsley and St Paul Rivers.

Conservation status
This species of spyridium is listed as "endangered" under the Australian Government Environment Protection and Biodiversity Conservation Act 1999 and the Tasmanian Government Threatened Species Protection Act 1995. The main threats to the species include changes in fire regimes, grazing and weed invasion, especially by gorse (Ulex europaeus).

References

lawrencei
Rosales of Australia
Flora of Tasmania
Taxa named by Joseph Dalton Hooker
Plants described in 1855